Urumuththa Almeda Maha Vidyalaya (commonly known as Urumuththa) is a government school for boys and girls in Urumuththa Akuressa, Sri Lanka that is located in the Akuressa Road Urumuththa Village. The college is situated in a hilly area, close to Akuressa main road with natural surroundings. The college was initially founded as a Buddhist school in 1930. The college presently consists of over 1000 students with children studying from primary level to secondary level education with a faculty of 40 teachers.

History
In 1930 Mr. Almeda started a small school using coconut foliage and wattle near the Urumuththa Kanitu Viduhala. It was the private Buddhist school.

1930 establishments in Ceylon
Provincial schools in Sri Lanka
Schools in Matara District